Gwalior East Assembly constituency is one of the 230 Vidhan Sabha (Legislative Assembly) constituencies of Madhya Pradesh state in central India. This constituency came into existence in 2008, following the delimitation of the legislative assembly constituencies.

Overview
Gwalior East (constituency number 16) is one of the 6 Vidhan Sabha constituencies located in Gwalior district. This constituency covers the ward numbers 19 to 29 and 37 to 41 of the Gwalior Municipal Corporation.

Gwalior East is part of Gwalior Lok Sabha constituency along with seven other Vidhan Sabha segments, namely, Gwalior, Gwalior South, Gwalior Rural, Bhitarwar and Dabra in this district and Karera and Pohari in Shivpuri district.

Members of Legislative Assembly

Election Results

2020
INC	Dr. Satish Sikarwar	75,342	49.69%	8,555
BJP	Munnalal Goyal (munna Bhaiya)	66,787	44.05%	
BSP	Mahesh Baghel	5,672	3.74%	
None of the Above	(NOTA)	1,785	1.18%	
Sapaks Party	Sunil Sharma	674	0.44%

2018

See also
 Gwalior

References

Gwalior
Assembly constituencies of Madhya Pradesh